The Copa Ciudad de Tigre is a professional tennis tournament played on hard courts. It is currently part of the ATP Challenger Tour. It is held annually in Tigre, Buenos Aires, Argentina since 2017.

Past finals

Singles

Doubles

ATP Challenger Tour
Hard court tennis tournaments
Tennis tournaments in Argentina